Zahida Khan is a Pakistani politician who has been a member of Senate of Pakistan, since March 2012.

Education
She received matriculation level education in 1995.

Political career
She was elected to the Senate of Pakistan as a candidate of Awami National Party in 2012 Pakistani Senate election.

References

Living people
Pakistani senators (14th Parliament)
Awami National Party politicians
Year of birth missing (living people)
Women members of the Senate of Pakistan
21st-century Pakistani women politicians